FSD may refer to:

Places
 Faisalabad, Pakistan
 Sioux Falls Regional Airport, in South Dakota, US (IATA code FSD)

Education
 Ferndale School District, Washington
 Florida School for the Deaf, St. Augustine, Florida
 Framwellgate School Durham, England
 Frankenmuth School District, Michigan
 Fremont School District (disambiguation)
 French School of Detroit, Michigan
 Filer School District, Idaho; See Filer High School
 Fellowship in Sports dentistry - Indian Dental Association

Organizations
 Florida State, Department, the state department for Florida, USA
 Foundation For Sustainable Development
 Freedom Service Dogs, an American animal rescue
 Hong Kong Fire Services Department
 Swiss Foundation for Mine Action

Science and technology

Computing
 File system driver
 Free Software Directory
 The Free Software Definition
 Full Self-Driving, an advanced driver-assistance system from Tesla, Inc.
 Functional specifications document

Other uses in science and technology
 Female sexual dysfunction
 Fourteen-segment display
 Flame supervision device
 Full scale deflection, the maximum amount the pointer of an analog meter can be deflected
 Free Shipping Day

Other uses
 Dirección Federal de Seguridad, or, in English, the Federal Security Directorate
 Fox Sports Detroit
 Free Software Daily, a website
 Forensic Science Division, or Forensic Science Department

 , a Polish auto manufacturer, in business 1952–2003